This Is How We Do It is the debut studio album by American singer and songwriter Montell Jordan. The album peaked at #12 on the Billboard 200 and #4 on the Top R&B/Hip-Hop Albums and was certified platinum. The album also featured the single "This Is How We Do It", which made it to #1 on the Billboard Hot 100, #1 on the Hot R&B/Hip-Hop Singles & Tracks and #1 on the Rhythmic Top 40. Another single, "Somethin' 4 da Honeyz", peaked at #21 on the Billboard Hot 100 and #18 on the Hot R&B/Hip-Hop Singles & Tracks chart.

Track listing

Charts

Weekly charts

Year-end charts

Certifications

References

Montell Jordan albums
1995 debut albums
Def Jam Recordings albums